Ladislav Volešák (born 7 April 1984, in Hradištko pod Medníkem) is a Czech football player who currently plays for Slovan Hradištko. He is an attacking midfielder and was a regular for Slavia Prague.

In January 2010 he joined SK Dynamo České Budějovice. Half year later he moved to 1. FC Slovácko. Volešák also played for youth national teams since the under-15 level.

References

External links
 
 
 Ladislav Volešák at TJ Štěchovice 

1984 births
Living people
Czech footballers
Czech Republic youth international footballers
Czech Republic under-21 international footballers
AC Sparta Prague players
SK Slavia Prague players
FK Mladá Boleslav players
SK Dynamo České Budějovice players
1. FC Slovácko players
1. FK Příbram players
FK Slavoj Vyšehrad players
Association football midfielders